Bowersox is a surname. Notable people with the surname include:

 John E. Bowersox (1885–1936), American stage and silent film actor
 Ken Bowersox, engineer, United States Naval officer, and astronaut
 Crystal Bowersox (born 1985), American singer, songwriter, and actress